Leo Charles Reise Jr. (June 7, 1922 – July 26, 2015) was a professional ice hockey player in the NHL and son of former pro Leo Reise. Reise was born in Stoney Creek, Ontario.

Playing career
Following junior hockey in Brantford and Guelph, Reise enlisted in the navy where he played for the naval teams of Victoria, Halifax and HMCS CHIPPAWA in Winnipeg where he played on the 1945 Basil Baker trophy winning team. Leo Reise began his NHL career following the end of World War II playing six games with the Chicago Black Hawks in the 1945–46 NHL season. After playing 17 games with Chicago the next season, he was traded to the Detroit Red Wings where he remained until the end of the 1951–52 NHL season. He finished his last two seasons, 1952–53 and 1953–54, with the New York Rangers. In 494 NHL games, he recorded 28 goals and 109 points. He won two Stanley Cups with the Detroit Red Wings in 1950 and 1952.

Post hockey
After his hockey career Reise went on to running a plumbing business in the Hamilton area.

Reise died of cancer on July 26, 2015 at the age of 93.

Trivia
 When Leo Reise Jr. entered the NHL in 1945, it was the first time in league history that a father and son had both made it to the NHL level. His father, Leo Reise played 8 seasons in the NHL.
 The Toronto Maple Leafs won the Stanley Cup in 1947, 1948, & 1949, but in an overtime game during the 1950 Stanley Cup Semi-Finals, Reise scored the winning goal which prevented the Leafs from winning four straight championships. This goal also propelled the Detroit Red Wings to an eventual Stanley Cup Championship.
 The last NHL team Reise played for was the New York Rangers, the same team his father retired from the NHL with.

Awards and achievements
USHL first All-Star team (1946)
NHL Second All-Star team (1950, 1951)
Played in NHL All-Star Game (1950, 1951, 1952, 1953)

Career statistics

References

External links

Reise Jr. at Legends of Hockey
 Reise Jr. at Detroit Red Wings Legends

1922 births
2015 deaths
Canadian military personnel of World War II
Chicago Blackhawks players
Detroit Red Wings players
Ice hockey people from Ontario
New York Rangers players
Sportspeople from Hamilton, Ontario
Stanley Cup champions
Canadian ice hockey defencemen
Canadian expatriates in the United States